Agios Georgios Greek Orthodox Church is a Greek Orthodox church dedicated to Saint George located in Kuzguncuk neighborhood of Üsküdar district in Istanbul, Turkey.

According to an inscription, the church underwent a complete renovation in 1821.

See also
 Agios Panteleimonas Greek Orthodox Church, Kuzguncuk

References

Greek Orthodox churches in Istanbul
Üsküdar
Bosphorus